Mochlus hinkeli, also known as Hinkel's red-sided skink or  Hinkel's red-flanked skink, is a species of skink. It is found in eastern Central Africa and East Africa, in the Republic of the Congo, the Democratic Republic of the Congo, Uganda, Rwanda, Burundi, western Kenya, and northern Angola and Zambia.

Mochlus hinkeli measure  in snout–vent length.

Subspecies
Two subspecies are recognized as being valid, including the nominotypical subspecies:
 Mochlus hinkeli hinkeli (Wagner et al., 2009)
 Mochlus hinkeli joei (Wagner et al., 2009)

References

Mochlus
Skinks of Africa
Reptiles of Angola
Vertebrates of Burundi
Reptiles of the Democratic Republic of the Congo
Reptiles of Kenya
Reptiles of the Republic of the Congo
Vertebrates of Rwanda
Reptiles of Uganda
Reptiles of Zambia
Reptiles described in 2009
Taxa named by Philipp Wagner
Taxa named by Wolfgang Böhme (herpetologist)
Taxa named by Olivier Sylvain Gérard Pauwels
Taxa named by Andreas Schmitz